City Manuel Doblado is a Mexican municipality located in the State of Guanajuato, Mexico. Its municipal seat is the city of the same name. City Manuel Doblado has an area of 810.43 square kilometres (2.67% of the surface of the State) and is bordered to the north by Romita, Purísima del Rincón and San Francisco del Rincón, to the southeast by Cuerámaro, to the south by Pénjamo, and to the west by the state of Jalisco. The municipality had a population of 38,309 inhabitants according to the 2005 census.

The municipality has been known at various times as Tierra Blanca(1680) Piedra Gorda (from 1681 to 1693), San Pedro Piedra Gorda (from 1693 to 1899), and since 1899 as City Manuel Doblado, in honor of a distinguished lawyer born in the municipality.

The Municipal President of City Manuel Doblado and its many smaller outlying communities is politician PAN Blanca Haydeé Preciado Pérez (2021–2024). Official Web Site:

Government and Politics

References 

Municipalities of Guanajuato
Populated places in Guanajuato
Populated places established in 1681
1681 establishments in the Spanish Empire